Dikgang Mathews Stock (born 3 February 1976) is a South African politician from the Northern Cape serving as a Member of the National Assembly of South Africa since 2019. Prior to his election to the National Assembly, he served as a permanent delegate to the National Council of Provinces from 2014 to 2019. Stock is a member of the African National Congress.

Career
Stock is a former provincial secretary of the African National Congress Youth League, a former member of the ANC provincial executive committee, and a 
former member of the national executive committee of the ANC youth league.

National Council of Provinces
In 2014, Stock became a permanent delegate to the National Council of Provinces.

During his tenure in the NCOP, he was the chairperson of the Ad Hoc Committee on the Funding of Political Parties. He was also whip of the provincial delegation and a whip on the Joint Committee on Constitutional Review.

National Assembly
Stock was elected to the National Assembly of South Africa in May 2019. As of June 2019, he serves on the Portfolio Committee on Social Development.

References

External links

Living people
1976 births
People from the Northern Cape
People from Pixley ka Seme District Municipality
African National Congress politicians
Members of the National Council of Provinces
Members of the National Assembly of South Africa